"Burn It!" is a single by UK band Modern Romance. It was released in 1984 as a 7-inch single and 12-inch single by the RCA Records. It was also released in the United States and Canada and was produced by Tony Visconti. It is taken from their 1984 studio album Burn It!, on which the final track is Burn It! [reprise].

Formats
7-inch single
Burn It!
Burn It! [Instrumental]

12-inch single
Burn It!
Burn It! [Instrumental]

7-inch single (America)
Burn It!
Burn It! (Dub Version)

12-inch single (America)'Burn It!Burn It! (Dub Version)

7-inch single (Canada)Burn It!Burn It!'' (Dub Version)

Personnel
Michael J. Mullins - vocals
David Jaymes - bass guitar
Robbie Jaymes - synthesizer
Paul Gendler - guitar
Andy Kyriacou - drums
Tony Visconti - Producer (music)

References

1984 singles
Modern Romance (band) songs
Song recordings produced by Tony Visconti
1984 songs
RCA Records singles
Songs written by David Jaymes
Songs written by Michael J. Mullins